Eddie Castro may refer to:

 Eddie Castro (jockey) (born 1985)
 Eddie Castro (speedway rider) (born 1959)